The 1981 NCAA Division I-AA football season, part of college football in the United States organized by the National Collegiate Athletic Association at the Division I-AA level, began in August 1981 and concluded with the 1981 NCAA Division I-AA Football Championship Game on December 19, 1981, at Memorial Stadium in Wichita Falls, Texas.

Conference changes and new programs
Prior to the 1981 season, the Mid-Continent Conference was shifted from Division II to Division I-AA; its four members, Eastern Illinois, Northern Iowa, Western Illinois, and Southwest Missouri State (now Missouri State), all made the transition. 
Northern Michigan and Youngstown State, who had been members of the Mid-Continent the previous season, departed the league before the shift.
After the 1981 season, three conferences, and all of their members, were shifted from Division I-A to Division I-AA: the Ivy League, the Southern Conference, and the Southland Conference

Conference standings

Conference champions

Postseason
After holding four-team playoffs after the first three I-AA seasons, the NCAA increased the bracket size to eight this postseason. It grew to twelve in 1982 and sixteen in 1986. The eight-team field was determined via automatic bids to five conference champions (Idaho State, South Carolina State, Eastern Kentucky, Jackson State, and Rhode Island), a bid to the top-ranked independent team (Tennessee State), and two at-large bids (Boise State and Delaware).

NCAA Division I-AA playoff bracket

* Next to team name denotes host institution

* Next to score denotes overtime

Source:

References